The European Super League was a proposed annual club football competition founded in 2021.

European Super League may also refer to:

Sports
 Super League the top division of the British and European rugby league system since 1996.
 Proposals for a European Super League in association football, a proposed league involving Europe's leading association football teams
 Eastern European Super League, an international American football tournament involving the best clubs from Russia and Belarus

Entertainment
 European Superleague, an association football management video game released in 1990
 European Super League, an association football management video game released in 2001

See also
 ESL (disambiguation)
 Euro league (disambiguation)
 European league (disambiguation)
 Super League (disambiguation)
 European Football League, an American football league in Europe
 Football Superleague of Kosovo, the top level of the Kosovar association football league system